The Hungarian Christian Democratic Movement (MKDM) was a political party in Czechoslovakia and Slovakia between 1990 and 1998. The party was led by Béla Bugár.

History
The party was in 1990, and allied with Coexistence to take part in the general elections that year. In the elections to the Czechoslovakian Federal Assembly the two parties won five seats in the Chamber of the People and seven in the Chamber of the Nations. In the elections to the National Council of Slovakia the alliance won 14 seats.

The parties maintained their alliance for the 1992 elections, maintaining the same number of seats in the Federal Assembly and the Slovak National Council.

In 1994 the party allied with Coexistence and the Hungarian Civic Party to form the Hungarian Coalition. In the elections that year the coalition won seventeen seats (seven of which were MKDM members), making it the third largest party in the National Council. The three parties officially merged into the Party of the Hungarian Coalition on 18 March 1998.

References

Political parties established in 1990
Political parties disestablished in 1998
Political parties in Czechoslovakia
Defunct political parties in Slovakia
Hungarians in Slovakia
Christian Democratic Movement
Christian democratic parties in Slovakia
Political parties of minorities in Slovakia
Hungarian minority interests parties